Rodrigo Barbosa Rodrigues Costa (born 30 July 1975) is a Brazilian former professional footballer who played as a central defender.

Career
Costa was born in Laranjal Paulista.

He played for C.S. Marítimo in the 1994–95 UEFA Cup.

In February 2002, he left Brazil again, for 1860 Munich. After four and a half seasons, he left for Standard Liège.

In his last year in Munich, he just played in the DFB-Pokal.

References

Living people
1975 births
Footballers from São Paulo (state)
Association football central defenders
Brazilian footballers
Sociedade Esportiva Palmeiras players
Guarani FC players
Esporte Clube Juventude players
Grêmio Foot-Ball Porto Alegrense players
Santos FC players
C.S. Marítimo players
TSV 1860 Munich players
Standard Liège players
Cerro Porteño players
Veria F.C. players
Bundesliga players
2. Bundesliga players
Belgian Pro League players
Brazilian expatriate footballers
Brazilian expatriate sportspeople in Belgium
Expatriate footballers in Belgium
Brazilian expatriate sportspeople in Germany
Expatriate footballers in Germany
Brazilian expatriate sportspeople in Paraguay
Expatriate footballers in Paraguay
Brazilian expatriate sportspeople in Portugal
Expatriate footballers in Portugal